Chacabuco is a department of San Luis Province, Argentina.

With an area of  it borders to the north with the department of Junín, to the west with San Martín and Coronel Pringles Department, San Luis, to the south with General Pedernera, and to the east with Cordoba Province

Municipalities 

 Concarán
 Cortaderas
 Naschel
 Papagayos
 Renca
 San Pablo
 Tilisarao
 Villa del Carmen
 Villa Larca

Education 

The capital of the department, Concarán, hosts the Technical School Governor Elias Adre, that is one of the three best secondary schools of San Luis Province. The Technical School title is of "electromechanic". As of 2018, the secondary has around 300 students, most of them, Concarán residents, but many students from surrounding towns, like Tilisarao, Villa Larca, and Merlo as well. And in a lower percentage, exchange or expat students, from the rest of America, and Europe.
The school counts with a natatorium, two gymnasiums, one medium and another huge, three workshops: Electricity, Carpentry, and Mechanics. It has a sciences lab too.
Because it's a technical school, it has 7 years, from First Year to Seventh Year, (or 7th Grade to 13th Grade, in the North American system), so students graduate when they are 18.

Villages 
 Balcarce
 Canal Norte
 Cuatro Esquinas
 El Churrasco
 El Porvenir
 El Recuerdo
 El Sauce
 El Sifón
 El Tala
 La Celestina
 La Estanzuela
 La Suiza
 Las Canteras
 Las Rosas
 Los Lobos
 Los Quebrachos
 Loma Verde
 Ojo de Agua
 Punta del Monte
 San Felipe
 San Miguel
 Santa Martina
 Villa Elena

References

External links 
 Provincial website

Departments of San Luis Province